The Nanjing–Wuhu Expressway, commonly referred to as the Ningwu Expressway is a north-south bound expressway that connects Nanjing, the capital city of Jiangsu and Wuhu, Anhui. It is an auxiliary route of G42 Shanghai–Chengdu Expressway that connects the parallel G42 and G50 Shanghai-Chongqing Expressway. The north terminus of G4211 is at Tianbao Bridge in Yuhuatai District, Nanjing, and the south terminus connects to G50 and G5011 Wuhu-Hefei Expressway via a cloverleaf interchange in Wuhu. G4211 is a four-lane limited access tollway for its entire length.

Route Description

|-
|Jiangsu
|17
|27
|-
|Anhui
|30
|48
|- class="sortbottom"
|Total
|47
|75 
|}

Jiangsu
G4211 begins at the G42 exit at Tianbao Bridge. The expressway then turns south through the Liucun Interchange, which connects Jiangsu S005 and G205 National Highway, and begins its concurrence with Jiangsu S105. G4211 is then connected to G2501 via two trumpet interchanges and a connector. From there, the expressway runs parallel to G205, as well as the Nanjing-Wuhu Railway. The route crosses Jiangsu-Anhui border at an exit to G205 and enters Ma'anshan, Anhui.

Anhui
G4211 continues to run parallel to G205, but bypasses downtown Ma'anshan to its east. At Nanhuanlu Road exit, the two parallel routes are connected via a G205 spur. The expressway then heads still south and bypasses Dangtu County, crossing Guxi River immediately to the south of downtown. It proceeds southbound until eventually terminating at a cloverleaf interchange with G50 and G5011 west to downtown Wuhu.

References

Chinese national-level expressways
Expressways in Jiangsu
Expressways in Anhui